The 2015 Pusamania Borneo season was the 2nd season in the club's football history and their 1st season in the Indonesia Super League, the top-flight division in Indonesia.

Review and events

Pre–2015 
They signed Hamka Hamzah as their first signing for the season on November 12, 2014. On December 7, 2014, Arcan Iurie was appointed as the new head coach replacing Iwan Setiawan and Fernando Gaston Soler was appointed as coach assistant. The team will have a one-week training camp in Samboja, starting December 23, 2014. Salvo will supply the kit for the squad for this season replacing Town.

The 2015 Indonesia Super League was officially discontinued by PSSI on May 2, 2015 due to a ban by Imam Nahrawi, Minister of Youth and Sports Affairs, against PSSI to run any football competition.

Matches

Legend

Friendlies

Indonesia Super League 

Notes
1.Pusamania Borneo's goals first.

Squad 
.

|}

Transfers

In

Out

References

External links 
 2015 Pusamania Borneo season at ligaindonesia.co.id 
 2015 Pusamania Borneo season at pusamaniafc.com 
 2015 Pusamania Borneo season at soccerway.com

Borneo F.C.
Pusamania Borneo